The 1991 Nescafé Extra Challenge was a professional non-ranking snooker tournament that was played in Bangkok, Thailand in March 1991. The event featured four professional players - Tony Drago, Joe Johnson, Alain Robidoux and James Wattana - and was played in a round-robin format. Johnson won all three of his matches and took the title, with Wattana finishing in second place. Drago compiled the highest  of the tournament, 142.


Results
If points were level then most frames won determined their positions.

  Alain Robidoux 5 – 0  Tony Drago
  Joe Johnson 5 – 1  James Wattana
  Joe Johnson 5 – 3  Alain Robidoux
  James Wattana 5 – 1  Tony Drago
  Joe Johnson 5 – 3  Tony Drago
  James Wattana 5 – 3  Alain Robidoux

References

1991 in snooker
Snooker in Thailand